Quinn McNeill (born 30 August 1998) is an Irish footballer who plays as a midfielder.

Career

Youth, College & Amateur
McNeill was born in Cork, Ireland, but grew up in Greenville, South Carolina. He attended J. L. Mann High School, also playing club soccer with the Carolina Elite Soccer Academy (CESA), where he was a five-time South Carolina State Champion.

In 2017, McNeill attended Clemson University to play college soccer. He redshirted his freshman season in 2017, but went on to make 77 appearances for the Tigers, scoring nine goals and tallying five assists, also helping the team to winning the NCAA National Championship in 2021.

While at college, McNeill also played in the NPSL with Greenville FC during their 2018 and 2019 seasons.

Professional
On 5 April 2022, McNeill signed with Major League Soccer club Charlotte FC on a one-year deal. He was immediately loaned to Charlotte Independence in the USL League One for the 2022 season. He made his professional league debut on 8 April, starting in a 3–3 draw with Central Valley Fuego FC.

References

1998 births
Living people
Association football midfielders
Charlotte FC players
Charlotte Independence players
Clemson Tigers men's soccer players
National Premier Soccer League players
People from Greenville, South Carolina
Soccer players from South Carolina
USL League One players
American soccer players
Major League Soccer players